D-Game 2000 is the second studio album by American rapper Big Pokey, from Houston, Texas. It was released on August 22, 2000, via Chevis Entertainment. The album peaked at #71 on the US Billboard Top R&B/Hip-Hop Albums chart.

Track listing

Chart positions

References

External links

2000 albums
Big Pokey albums